Col. Henryk Torunczyk, born in Włocławek, (1909–1966) was a Polish soldier. He later volunteered to fight with the International Brigades in the Spanish Civil War. He was sometime commander of the Naftali Botwin Company; Chief of Staff of XIII International Brigade and leader of an International Unit formed in January 1939 from a rump of Brigade veterans who remained in Spain after demoblisation. They crossed the border in Spain on about 9 January 1939 He later became a partisan. From 1943 he was instrumental in forming the Samodzielny Batalion Szturmowy. In 1945 he was briefly commanding officer of the Polish Internal Security Corps.

He is also called: Henrik Torunczyk and Henrik Tourunczyk.

See also
Hugh Thomas, The Spanish Civil War, 4th Rev. Ed. 2001.
Antony Beevor, The Battle for Spain, 2007.
Cecil Eby, Comrades and Commissars, 2007.

References

1909 births
1966 deaths
Polish soldiers
Polish people of the Spanish Civil War
International Brigades personnel